Hoogeveen is a former municipality in the Dutch province of South Holland. It was located about 2 km east of the town of Nootdorp.

Hoogeveen was a separate municipality between 1817 and 1833, when it merged with Nootdorp.

References

Former municipalities of South Holland